A buñuelo (alternatively called boñuelo, bimuelo, birmuelo, bermuelo, bumuelo, burmuelo, or bonuelo;) is a fried dough fritter found in Spain, Latin America, and other regions with a historical connection to Spaniards, including Southwest Europe, the Balkans, Anatolia, and other parts of Asia and North Africa. Buñuelos are traditionally prepared at Christmas. It will usually have a filling or a topping. In Mexican cuisine, it is often served with a syrup made with piloncillo.

Buñuelos are first known to have been consumed among Spain's Morisco population. They typically consist of a simple, wheat-based yeast dough, often flavored with anise, that is thinly rolled, cut or shaped into individual pieces, then fried and finished off with a sweet topping. Buñuelos may be filled with a variety of things, sweet or savory. They can be round in ball shapes or disc-shaped. In Latin America, buñuelos are seen as a symbol of good luck.

Etymology 

The , which is a French cuisine dough fritter similar to the buñuelo, is etymologically cognate and derives its name via the Germanic Frankish language.  has been borrowed into English via French. 

Other cognates include Old High German  (“swelling, tuber”), German , Dutch  (“lump, clump”), Gaulish , Scottish Gaelic  (“cake, biscuit”).

History 

Dough fritters are known in Mediterranean cuisine from the work of Cato the Elder who included a recipe with the name "balloons" in his book De Agri Cultura, which was written in the second century BC. In that recipe, flour and cheese balls were fried and served with a spread made of honey and poppy seeds.

The society following the Roman one that consumed buñuelos was the Moorish. Its citizens, people of humble means, who inhabited the southern territories of the Iberian Peninsula and occupied low-level jobs, also served as street vendors selling buñuelos. In Seville and Granada, honey-fried buñuelos covered in honey were typical dessert. On the other hand, this specialty was adopted by the gypsies after the Moorish expulsion and perpetuated until today.

A 19th century recipe from California, described as pasta de freir (dough to fry), is made by folding whipped egg whites into a mixture of flour, water, sugar, oil and orange blossom water. This is used as a batter to fry apples or other fruit. A variation called suspiros de monjas (nun's sighs) includes butter and egg yolks. Buñuelos de Valparaiso are garnished with walnuts and sherry or maraschino flavored simple syrup.

Regional adaptations

In Spain, buñuelos are a dessert and snack typical in many autonomous communities and, especially, during their regional holidays. Each territory incorporates its own ingredients and its own tradition.
In Catalonia, they are consumed mostly during Lent. The most famous are those of wind, cream and Brunyols de l'Empordà. They are usually eaten as a snack or to accompany coffee after lunch. In some regions of Spain, buñuelos find a strong competitor in churros, which are increasingly widespread at parties normally associated with buñuelos. On the other hand, in Catalonia, churros are primarily consumed by tourists; Catalans prefer the xuixos or chuchos in churrerías or the buñuelos in their multiple forms in bakeries or in houses.
In Valencia, the highest consumption is concentrated in festivities such as Fallas de Valencia, where pumpkin buñuelos are made.
In the Balearic Islands, there are sweet fritters for different parties of the year (Las Vírgenes, Todos los Santos, Lent, etc.) and, depending on the occasion, they can contain potato or sweet potato, Mahón cheese, dried figs, etc.
In Madrid and Andalusia, they are consumed with special assiduity during the Festival of Saints, during which it was customary for women to prepare them in the houses and sell them or give them to neighbors, especially in the  villages.
 In Colombia they are made with a small curd white cheese and formed into doughy balls then fried golden brown. They use cassava flour and cornmeal instead of wheat. It is a traditional Christmas dish, served along with natillas and manjar blanco.
 In Cuba they are traditionally twisted in a figure 8 and covered in an anise caramel. The dough contains cassava and malanga.
 In the Dominican Republic, buñuelos are rolled into balls from a dough made of cassava (called yuca) and eggs. They are then covered in a cinnamon sugar syrup, often using coconut milk instead of water.
 In Nicaragua, buñuelos are made from cassava, eggs, and white grating cheese. The buñuelos are rolled into balls and deep fried. They are served alongside a syrup made of sugar, water, cinnamon sticks, and cloves. They are eaten year-round, and are a typical side dish or snack served during holidays.
They are commonly eaten with tsokolate, the local hot chocolate drink. There are also unique local variants of buñuelos, the most common is cascaron (also bitsu-bitsu) which is made with ground glutinous rice (galapong) rather than regular flour. Another variant is bunwelos na saging, which is made with mashed bananas added into the mixture, similar to maruya, a Filipino banana fritter. 
 In Puerto Rico, buñuelos are small and round. The dough is often made with milk, baking powder, sugar, eggs, and a starch. Apio, cornmeal, cassava, chickpeas, almond flour, rice, squash, sweet potatoes, taro, potatoes, yams, ripe breadfruit, and sweet plantains are some of the starches used. There are more than twenty buñuelos recipes in Puerto Rico. Often rolled in cornstarch before frying or fried just as. Recipes have been written in Puerto Rican cuisine scenes of the 1800s. They are often filled with cheese and ham for breakfast. They are popular around Christmas served in anis flavored syrup. Lemon peel, rum, guava, cinnamon, and vanilla can also be added to the syrup. 
 In Mexico buñuelos are made from a yeasted dough with a hint of anise that is deep-fried, then drenched in a syrup of brown sugar, cinnamon, and guava. Buñuelos are commonly served in Mexico and other Latin American countries with powdered sugar, a cinnamon and sugar topping, or hot sugar cane syrup (piloncillo) and are sold in fairs, carnivals, and Christmas events such as Las Posadas.
 In Peru, buñuelos resemble picarones in shape (round and ring shaped) but lack yam or squashes as in picarones. Made of flour, water, sugar, anise, and yeast, they are served with a sweet syrup made of chancaca (sugar cane derived sweet). They are a common street food native to Arequipa. 
 In Italy, they are usually served with cream, and popular during Carnival time, in particular in the North-East of the country.
 In Uruguay sweet buñuelos are made with apples and bananas and covered in sugar. Salty variations are traditionally made of spinach, cow fat and seaweed. Seaweed buñuelos are considered a delicacy in Rocha Department.
 In Sephardic Jewish cuisine, bimuelos (also bumuelos or binuelos) are traditionally made from yeasted wheat dough and covered in a honey glaze, sometimes with orange flavour. Sephardic Jews in Turkey traditionally make buñuelos with matzo meal and eat them during Passover.

There are also buñuelos in Turkey, India, and Russia. 

In many Latin American countries, this particular dish can also be made with flour tortillas, and covered in sugar or cinnamon.

In popular culture
December 16th is National Buñuelo day (Día Nacional del Buñuelo). Buñuelo was featured on the Netflix TV series Street Food in season 2.

See also

 List of fried dough foods
 List of doughnut varieties
 Hojuela
 Mexican breads
 Luis Buñuel

References

External links

Spanish cuisine
Italian cuisine
Latin American cuisine
Cuban cuisine
Colombian cuisine
Dominican Republic cuisine
Nicaraguan cuisine
Argentine desserts
Paraguayan desserts
Peruvian desserts
Uruguayan desserts
Mexican desserts
Puerto Rican cuisine
Doughnuts
Venezuelan cuisine
Bolivian cuisine
Guatemalan cuisine
Sephardi Jewish cuisine
Jewish baked goods
Philippine breads
Guamanian cuisine
Cassava dishes
Lenten foods
Latin American pastries
Hanukkah foods
Cuisine of the Southwestern United States
Christmas food

fr:Buñuelo
vec:Frìtoła